Ziraat Katılım is a state-owned participation bank in Turkey. The bank was founded on 12 May 2015, and is wholly owned by Treasury of Turkey. Ziraat Katılım is a member of Ziraat Finance Group, which has Turkey's largest bank Ziraat Bankası both per number of branches and total assets, as of 2016. Its slogan is "Paylaştıkça daha fazlası" (Turkish: Even more when shared).

The official opening ceremony was held on 29 May 2015, on the anniversary of Fall of Constantinople with participation of the President of Turkey. First account was opened for the President Erdoğan.

The logo of the bank is very similar to Ziraat Bankası, both resembling an "ear of wheat" with bank initials, ZB and ZK respectively. Ziraat Bank logo additionally contains the letters "TC" for Republic of Turkey (Turkish: Türkiye Cumhuriyeti).

Ziraat Katılım has 82 branches over Turkey. Ziraat Katılım has profit and loss partnership, consumer finance, credit card islamic license.

References

External links 
 Ziraat Katılım website

Banks established in 2015
Participation banks
Banks of Turkey